Glen Riddle station was a commuter rail station on the SEPTA Regional Rail R3 West Chester Line, located underneath the South Pennell Road (PA-452) overpass in Middletown Township, Pennsylvania. Originally built by the West Chester and Philadelphia Railroad, it later served the Pennsylvania Railroad's West Chester Branch, which finally became SEPTA's R3 line.

The station, and all of those west of Elwyn, was closed in September 1986, due to deteriorating track conditions and Chester County's desire to expand facilities at Exton station on SEPTA's Paoli/Thorndale Line. Service was "temporarily suspended" at that time, with substitute bus service provided. Glen Riddle station still appears in publicly posted tariffs.

The station was demolished in the 1990s; the asphalt platform and access road survives. Resumption of SEPTA service to Wawa station does not include an intermediate stop at Glen Riddle, although the service restoration project provides for construction of a new station if demand warrants.

References

External links

Railway stations closed in 1986
Former SEPTA Regional Rail stations
Stations on the West Chester Line
Demolished railway stations in the United States
Former railway stations in Delaware County, Pennsylvania